Elampus is a genus of insects belonging to the family Chrysididae.

The species of this genus are found in Europe, Japan, Africa and Northern America.

Species:
 Elampus albipennis Mocsary, 1889
 Elampus ambiguus Dahlbom, 1854

References

Chrysididae
Hymenoptera genera